Ligustrum expansum is a plant species native to China and Vietnam. The Flora of China lists Ligustrum robustum subsp. chinense P.S.Green as a separate taxon, but more recent sources regard this name as a synonym of L. expansum. Combining the two listings yields a distribution within China including the Provinces of Anhui, Fujian, Guangdong, Guangxi, Guizhou, Hubei, Hunan, Jiangxi, Sichuan, and Yunnan.

Etymology
Ligustrum means ‘binder’. It was named by Pliny and Virgil.

References

expansum
Plants described in 1916
Flora of Vietnam
Flora of China
Flora of Yunnan
Flora of Sichuan
Flora of Jiangxi
Flora of Hunan
Flora of Hubei
Flora of Guizhou
Flora of Guangxi
Flora of Guangdong
Flora of Fujian
Flora of Anhui